Raymondaspis is a genus of trilobites in the family Styginidae. It was described by Pribyl in 1949, and contains the species R. reticulatus and R. turgidus from the Whiterockian of Canada, R. vespertina from the Ordovician and Whiterockian of the United States and Norway, and a new species, R. grandigena, which existed during the Middle Ordovician of what is now Sweden. R. grandigena was described in 2012 by Martin Stein and Jan Bergström.

References

External links
 Raymondaspis at the Paleobiology Database

Styginidae
Corynexochida genera
Fossil taxa described in 1949
Ordovician trilobites of North America
Paleozoic life of Newfoundland and Labrador